Rabot Island is an island  long and  wide, lying  south of Renaud Island in the Biscoe Islands. First charted by the French Antarctic Expedition, 1903–05, under Jean-Baptiste Charcot, who named it for Charles Rabot.

Originally discovered by John Biscoe.

See also 
 List of Antarctic islands south of 60° S
 Monflier Point, marks the southwest end of Rabot Island
 Rodman Passage

References

External links 

Islands of the Biscoe Islands